Robert Newton Page (October 26, 1859 – October 3, 1933) was a U.S. Representative from North Carolina.

Born in Cary, North Carolina, Page attended the Cary High School and Bingham Military School in Mebane, North Carolina. He moved to Aberdeen, North Carolina, in 1880 and engaged in the lumber business near Aberdeen until 1900. He served as mayor of Aberdeen (1890–1898). Page was also the Treasurer of the Aberdeen & Asheboro Railroad Co. (1894–1902). In 1897, he moved to Biscoe, North Carolina. He served as a member of the state House of Representatives in 1901 and 1902.

Page married Flora Eliza Shaw on June 20, 1888, in Manly, North Carolina. They had four children: Thaddeus Shaw Page, Richard Eastwood Page, Robert Newton Page, Jr., and Kate Raboteau Page.

Page was elected as a Democrat to the Fifty-eighth and to the six succeeding Congresses (March 4, 1903 – March 3, 1917). He was not a candidate for renomination in 1916. He returned to Aberdeen in 1920 and that year was an unsuccessful candidate for Governor (Cameron Morrison won the primary, while O. Max Gardner came in second).

Later, Page engaged in banking, and was president of the Page Trust Co. He died in Aberdeen on October 3, 1933, and was interred in Old Bethesda Cemetery.

His elder brother was Walter Hines Page, Ambassador to Great Britain.

References

1859 births
1933 deaths
Democratic Party members of the North Carolina House of Representatives
Democratic Party members of the United States House of Representatives from North Carolina
19th-century American railroad executives
20th-century American railroad executives
People from Cary, North Carolina
People from Biscoe, North Carolina